Liu Qing is the name of the following Chinese people:

 Liu Qing (prince) (78–106), Han dynasty crown prince
 Liu Qing (basketball) (born 1964), basketball player
 Liu Qing (businesswoman) (born 1978), President of Didi Chuxing
 Liu Qing (footballer) (born 1986), football player
 Liu Qing (taekwondo) (born 1993), taekwondo practitioner from Macau
 Liu Qing (runner) (born 1986), middle-distance runner
 Liu Qing (political scientist) (born 1963), Chinese political scientist